White Christmas is a 2011 South Korean television series starring Kim Sang-kyung, Baek Sung-hyun, and a cast of then-rookie actors, namely Kim Young-kwang, Lee Soo-hyuk, Kwak Jung-wook, Hong Jong-hyun, Esom, Kim Woo-bin, Sung Joon, Jung Suk-won, and Lee El. Written by Park Yeon-seon and directed by Kim Yong-soo, it aired as part of the Drama Special Series on KBS2 from January 30 to March 20, 2011 on Sundays at 23:15 for 8 episodes.

A series of deaths, including murder and suicide, take place over eight days in a private, elite high school deep in the mountains, with the students cut off from the outside world and in highly volatile and unstable emotional conditions. The drama deals with the question of whether evil is organic or environmental, and the potential for adolescents to be extremely empathetic as well as equally cruel.

Plot
Deep in the mountains of Gangwon, the private, elite Soo-sin High School is attended by the top 1% of students in the country. Their stellar marks are the result of constant pressure and a strict punishment system, to the point where students avoid any activities outside of studying. It is in this atmosphere that seven students and a teacher remain at school for the winter break, joined by Kim Yo-han (Kim Sang-kyung), a psychiatrist who was forced to take shelter with them after he was injured in a car accident nearby. Stranded from heavy snow, they spend eight days together ― from Christmas Eve to New Year's Day.

Park Mu-yeol (Baek Sung-hyun) is an honor student who chooses to remain in school during the winter break after receiving an abusive letter. Jo Young-jae (Kim Young-kwang) is a detested bully who attacks other people to hide his inferiority complex. Yoon Soo (Lee Soo-hyuk) is a disturbed, but rich student fronting a rock band. Yoon Eun-sung (Esom) was once a popular girl in school before having a sudden change of personality.

At a time when everyone else is celebrating the holidays, the students realize that the anonymous letters they each received were not the result of a harmless prank; there is a murderer in their midst. A question lies unspoken: Are monsters created, or are humans born monsters?

Cast
Kim Sang-kyung as Kim Yo-han
Baek Sung-hyun as Park Mu-yeol 
Kim Young-kwang as Jo Young-jae 
Lee Soo-hyuk as Yoon Soo
Kwak Jung-wook as Yang Kang-mo
Hong Jong-hyun as Lee Jae-kyu
Esom as Yoon Eun-sung
Kim Woo-bin as Kang Mi-reu 
Sung Joon as Choi Chi-hoon 
Jung Suk-won as Yoon Jong-il
Lee El as Oh Jung-hye

See also
 List of Christmas films

Notes

References

External links
 
 
 

2011 South Korean television series debuts
2011 South Korean television series endings
Korean Broadcasting System television dramas
Korean-language television shows
South Korean mystery television series
South Korean thriller television series
Christmas television series
Television shows set in Gangwon Province, South Korea